XPath 3 is the latest version of the XML Path Language, a query language for selecting nodes in XML documents. It supersedes XPath 1.0 and XPath 2.0.

XPath 3.0 became a W3C Recommendation on 8 April 2014, while XPath 3.1 became a W3C Recommendation on 21 March 2017.

New features in XPath 3.0 

Compared to XPath 2.0, XPath 3.0 adds the following new features:

 Inline function expressions
 Anonymous functions can be created in an expression context. For example, the expression  creates a function that returns the product of its two arguments. The expression  creates a sequence of functions, each one returning a different node from a collection.
 Dynamic function calls
 Function values may be called without being referenced by name. For example,  fetches the second item from sequence $f, and invokes it as a function, passing the string "Hi there" as argument.
 Union types
 Union types, as defined in XML Schema, may be used in type conversions and function type signatures.
 Namespace literals
 XML namespaces may be referenced using braced URI literals.
 String concatenation operator
 Mapping operator
 The new ! operator performs simple mapping: E1 ! E2 evaluates E2 for each item in the sequence E1, and concatenates the resulting items. This is comparable to the path operator /, but the ! operator does not perform duplicate elimination nor document ordering of the results.

New features in XPath 3.1 

XPath 3.1 mainly adds support for array and map (associative array) data types. These types and their associated functionality are intended to ease working with JSON data.

Another innovation is the arrow operator => for function chaining. For example, the XPath 2.0 expression

can now be written

References 

 
 

XML data access